Jason Niles (December 19, 1814 – July 7, 1894) was a lawyer, newspaper editor, and politician in the United States.  He served as mayor and for one term as a U.S. Representative from Mississippi from 1873 to 1875.

Biography
Niles was born in Burlington, Vermont on December 19, 1814, the son of Daniel Swift Niles and Alice Reed, both natives of New Hampshire.  He attended the local schools of Burlington, received a bachelor's degree from the University of Vermont in 1836, and a master's degree in 1846.  He taught school in Quebec, Ohio, and Tennessee, and later moved to Mississippi.

While teaching school, Niles studied law; he was admitted to the bar in 1851 and began a practice in Kosciusko.  He served as an anti-secession delegate to Mississippi's 1851 constitutional convention.

Civil War
During the American Civil War, Niles was a supporter of the Union; he remained in Mississippi, and worked to keep a low public profile.  Though he was a diarist and kept a journal for nearly 30 years beginning in 1831, Niles made no entries for the first two years of the war, presumably to avoid having local Confederates use his writings to prove disloyalty.  Niles did not want to serve in the Confederate military, and arranged to have the son of a friend serve in Mississippi's state troops as a substitute.  He later ran for mayor, presuming that if he won, his status as an elected official would be exempt from military service.  He was elected in May 1864, and served one term.

Post-Civil War
Niles continued his pro-Union politics after the war; he was a delegate to Mississippi's constitutional conventions in 1865 and 1868.  He also served in the Mississippi House of Representatives in 1870.  In 1871 he was appointed judge of Mississippi's 13th district, and he served until 1872.

In 1872, Niles was elected as a Republican to the 43rd Congress.  He served one term, March 4, 1873 to March 3, 1875.  With the end of Reconstruction in Mississippi, the Democratic Party returned to power, and Niles was an unsuccessful candidate for reelection in 1874.

From 1876 to 1880, Niles was editor of the Kosciusko Chronicle newspaper.  He then returned to the practice of law.

Death and burial
Niles died in Kosciusko, Mississippi, July 7, 1894 and was interred at Kosciusko's City Cemetery.

Family
In 1847, Niles married Harriet N. McRee in Bedford County, Tennessee; she was the daughter of William Elliot McRee and Sarah McLean Houston.  Their children included:

Alice Redd Niles, born March 15, 1848
Henry Clay Niles, born June 4, 1840
Sallie Houston Niles, born December 31, 1852
Mary Niles, born December 30, 1855
Lucy Niles, born August 30, 1858
Jennie Niles, born August 13, 1861
Lydia Niles, born June 19, 1866

Henry Clay Niles served as a federal judge in Mississippi.  Jason Niles was the cousin of Thomas Brackett Reed, who served as Speaker of the United States House of Representatives.

References

Sources

Newspapers

Internet

External sources

1814 births
1894 deaths
Politicians from Burlington, Vermont
University of Vermont alumni
Mississippi state court judges
Republican Party members of the Mississippi House of Representatives
Republican Party members of the United States House of Representatives from Mississippi
19th-century American politicians
19th-century American judges